Full Moon Over Miami is a one-off programming block of a three-way, two-hour crossover event on NBC which involved three television sitcoms created by Susan Harris: The Golden Girls, Empty Nest and Nurses. The event depicts a fictional full moon on Leap Day storming into the storylines of the three series set in Miami, Florida. The episodes aired back-to-back on Saturday, February 29, 1992 from 8:00 to 10:00 p.m. EST.

The Full Moon Over Miami block is similar to the previous NBC Hurricane Saturday block of November 9, 1991 when a fictional hurricane was woven into the storylines of the same three series.

Plot

The event begins on The Golden Girls one-hour episode "A Midwinter Night's Dream" (season 7, episodes 20 and 21) as a full moon on Leap Day falls upon the household which prompts Blanche to host a men-only Moonlight Madness Party and strange happenings abound: all the men are attracted to Dorothy while none are attracted to Blanche; Rose proposes to Miles after winning a free honeymoon to Paris and Sophia has fun with a witch's hex cast on Dorothy and goes through all the necessary steps to try and release her from it. The full moon and festivities prompt other strange happenings: Dorothy and Miles find themselves sharing a passionate kiss, and Blanche's necklace disappears while she necks with a British man named Derek. Carol and Barbara Weston (from Empty Nest) are featured in the episode: Barbara shows up to confront Sophia, who attempted to cause a fight between her and Carol to break a curse, and Carol invites herself to Blanche's party.

The event continues on the Empty Nest episode "Dr. Weston and Mr. Hyde" (season 4, episode 20) as Dr. Harry Weston throws out his back and goes off his rocker after taking the wrong medicine that makes him act very strange. Barbara thinks their dog Dreyfuss may be masquerading as a repairman – after all, she's never seen the two of them together. Rose Nylund (from The Golden Girls) drops in on the Westons for some advice about romance.

The event ends on the Nurses episode "Moon Over Miami" (season 1, episode 20) as Charlie Dietz (from Empty Nest) and Blanche Devereaux (from The Golden Girls), both affected by the full moon, turn up at the hospital: Blanche seeks Dr. Riskin's advice about a tonic for her sexual dry spell and a desperate Sandy considers dating Charlie. Greg encourages his co-workers to pursue their romantic fantasies and an astronaut arrives with a lump on his head.

Cast

See also
Hurricane Saturday – an earlier crossover event involving three NBC sitcoms: The Golden Girls, Empty Nest and Nurses
Night of the Hurricane – a similar crossover event involving three Fox animated series: Family Guy,  American Dad! and The Cleveland Show

References

External links
The Golden Girls: "A Midwinter Night's Dream" on IMDb
Empty Nest: "Dr. Weston and Mr. Hyde" on IMDb
Nurses: "Moon Over Miami" on IMDb

The Golden Girls
Crossover television
1992 American television episodes